Croats are a recognized national minority in Serbia, a status they received in 2002. The majority of the Bunjevac and Šokac communities traditionally identify as part of the Croatian minority as well. According to the 2011 census, there were 57,900 Croats in Serbia or 0.8% of the country's population. Of these, 47,033 lived in Vojvodina, where they formed the fourth largest ethnic group, representing 2.8% of the population. A further 7,752 lived in the national capital Belgrade, with the remaining 3,115 in the rest of the country.

History

During the 15th century, Croats mostly lived in the Syrmia region. It is estimated that they were a majority in 76 out of 801 villages that existed in the present-day territory of Vojvodina.

According to 1851 data, it is estimated that the population of the Voivodeship of Serbia and Banat of Temeschwar, the historical province that was predecessor of present-day Vojvodina, included, among other ethnic groups, 62,936 Bunjevci and Šokci and 2,860 Croats. Subsequent statistical estimations from the second half of the 19th century (conducted during Austro-Hungarian period) counted Bunjevci and Šokci as "others" and presented them separately from Croats (in 1910 Austro-Hungarian census, 70,000 Bunjevci were categorized as "others").

The 1910 Austro-Hungarian census also showed large differences in the numbers of those who considered themselves Bunjevci and Šokci, and those who considered themselves Croats. According to the census, in the city of Subotica there were only 39 citizens who declared Croatian as their native language, while 33,390 citizens were listed as speakers of "other languages" (most of them declared Bunjevac as their native language). In the city of Sombor, 83 citizens declared Croatian language, while 6,289 citizens were listed as speakers of "other languages" (mostly Bunjevac). In the municipality of Apatin, 44 citizens declared Croatian and 7,191 declared "other languages" (mostly Bunjevac, Šokac and Gypsy). 

In Syrmia, which was then part of the Kingdom of Croatia-Slavonia, according to the 1910 census results Croats were a relative or absolute majority in Gibarac (843 Croats or 86.46% out of total population), Kukujevci (1,775 or 77.61%), Novi Slankamen (2,450 or 59.22%), Petrovaradin (3,266 or 57.02%), Stari Slankamen (466 or 48.19%), Hrtkovci (1,144 or 45.43% ) and Morović (966 or 41.67%). Other places which had a significant minority of Croats included Novi Banovci (37.70%), Golubinci (36.86%), Sremska Kamenica (36.41%), Sot (33.01%), Sremska Mitrovica (30.32%), Sremski Karlovci (29.94%) and Ljuba (29.86%).

In 1925, Bunjevac-Šokac Party and Pučka kasina organized in Subotica the 1000th-anniversary celebration of the establishment of Kingdom of Croatia, when in 925 Tomislav of Croatia became first king of the Croatian Kingdom. On the King Tomislav Square in Subotica a memorial plaque was unveiled with the inscription "The memorial plaque of millennium of Croatian Kingdom 925-1925. Set by Bunjevci Croats". Besides Subotica, memorial plaques of King Tomislav were also revealed in Sremski Karlovci and Petrovaradin.

In 1990s, during the war in Croatia was persecution of Croats in Serbia during Yugoslav Wars, members of Serbian Radical Party organized and participated in the expulsion of the Croats in some places in Vojvodina.  The President of the Serbian Radical Party, Vojislav Šešelj is indicted for participation in these events. According to some estimations, the number of Croats which have left Serbia under political pressure of the Milošević's regime might be between 20,000 and 40,000.

In 2020 the birth home of ban Josip Jelačić built in the 18th century and located in Petrovaradin, was bought by the Republic of Serbia from private owners. It was later reconstructed and given as a gift to the Croatian community.

Coat of arms

Flag and coat of arms of Croats of Serbia were adopted on 11 June 2005 in a  session of the Croat National Council, in Subotica.

Politics
The Croat National Council is a body of self-government of the Croatian minority in Serbia. On 11 June 2005 the Council adopted the historical coat of arms of Croatia, a checkerboard consisting of 13 red and 12 white fields (the difference with the Croatian coat of arms being the crown on top).

Demographics

In the results of census taking is a disagreement between real ethnicity and declared ethnicity. Most citizens who declare that they belong to a specific ethnic/minority group, already come from families with mixed family backgrounds (e.g. mixed marriages between different nationalities/ethnicities, interreligious marriages). The Republic of Serbia is using a "segregated model of multiculturalism". The national councils receive funds from the state and province to finance their own governing body, cultural, and educational organisations. The amount of money for the national councils, depends on the results of a census in which the Serbian population can register and self-declare as a member of a state-recognized minority of their choice.

Today, most members of the Šokci community consider themselves Croats. The Bunjevci in the Hungarian and Serbian Bačka region, are split between those who declare themselves as a distinct ethnic group with their own language and those who identify themselves as a Croatian sub-ethnic group. The latter are represented in Serbia by the Croat National Council, and the former by the Bunjevac National Council. Not all Croats in Serbia have Bunjevac or Sokac origins.

The number of Croats in Serbia was somewhat larger in previous censuses that were conducted between 1948 and 1991. Proponents of a separate Bunjevac nation argue that the number of Croats may have been smaller at that time, as the communist authorities counted in the people to as Croats, who self-declared as Bunjevac or Sokac. Robert Skenderović emphasizes that already before 1918 and the Communist rule, Bunjevci have  made strong efforts to be recognized as part of the Croatian people. 

The largest recorded number of Croats in a census was in 1961 when there were 196,409 Croats (including Bunjevci and Šokci) in the Socialist Republic of Serbia (around 2.57% of the total population of Serbia at the time). Since 1961 census, the Croat population in Serbia is in a constant decrease. This is caused by various reasons, including economic emigration, and ethnic tensions of the Yugoslav wars during the 1990s, more specifically the 1991-1995 War in Croatia. During this war-time period, Croats in Serbia were under pressure from the Serbian Radical Party and some Serb refugees from Croatia and Bosnia and Herzegovina to move to Croatia. In that time, a transfer of population occurred between Croats from Serbia and Serbs from Croatia. Based on an investigation by the Humanitarian Law Fund from Belgrade in the course of June, July, and August 1992, more than 10,000 Croats from Vojvodina exchanged their property for the property of Serbs from Croatia, and altogether about 20,000 Croats left Serbia. According to other estimations, the number of Croats who have left Serbia under political pressure of the Milošević's regime might be between 20,000 and 40,000. According to Petar Kuntić of Democratic Alliance of Croats in Vojvodina, 50,000 Croats were pressured to move out from Serbia during the Yugoslav wars.

* - excluding Kosovo

Croats in Vojvodina

Croats are the fourth largest ethnic group in the Vojvodina province, an autonomous province located in the northern part of the country which traditionally fosters multilingualism, multiculturalism and multiconfessionalism. According to the 2011 census, there are 47,033 Croats living in Vojvodina.

In the 1990s, during the Milošević regime (1989–1997), it was life-threatening in Serbia to declare to be a Bunjevac Croat: "... to declare themselves as Bunjevac in order to avoid being stigmatised as Croats, thus increasing the number of self-declared Bunjevci in the 1990s."

Croats of Šokac origin constituting the largest part of population in three villages: Sonta (in the municipality of Apatin), Bački Breg and Bački Monoštor (both in the municipality of Sombor).  And Croats of Bunjevac origin are living traditionally in Subotica, which is their cultural and political center; in Bajmok, Bikovo, Donji Tavankut and Gornji Tavankut, Đurđin, Ljutovo, Mala Bosna, Sombor, and Stari Žednik.

source:note1: The numbers were adjusted for the present borders of Vojvodina.note2: Croats are counted together with Bunjevci and Šokci for data before 1991.Language
Croatian, a standard variety of the pluricentric language Serbo-Croatian, is listed, since 2002, as one of the six official languages of Vojvodina. 

Bunjevac dialect

Some members of the Bunjevac community, preserved a Neo-Shtokavian–Younger Ikavian dialect of the Serbo-Croatian pluricentric language, also known as Bunjevac dialect or Bunjevac speech'. Their accent is purely Ikavian, with /i/ for the Common Slavic vowels yat. Since 2021, Croatia has categorized the Neo-Stokavian Younger Ikavian dialect to be the Bunjevac dialect with three sub-branches: Danubian (also known as Bunjevac), Littoral-Lika, and Dalmatian (also known as Bosnian–Dalmatian). Its speakers largely use the Latin alphabet and are living in parts of Bosnia and Herzegovina, parts of Croatia, southern parts (inc. Budapest) of Hungary as well in parts of the autonomous province Vojvodina of Serbia. 

There have been three meritorious people who preserved the Bunjevac dialect in two separate dictionaries: Grgo Bačlija and Marko Peić with "Ričnik bački Bunjevaca" (editions 1990, 2018), and Ante Sekulić with "Rječnik govora bačkih Hrvata''" (2005). 

For decades, there has been an unresolved language battle within the Bunjevac community and between Serbia and Croatia over the status of the Bunjevac speech.

The dialect, of the in Serbia residating Danubian Bunjevci, was standardized in the Republic of Serbia in 2018 and officially approved as a standard dialect by the Ministry of Education for learning in schools. Speakers use in general the standardized dialect variety for writing and conversation in formal situations. Theodora Vuković has provided, in 2009, the scientific methodology for the finalization of the standardization process of the Bunjevac dialect corpus in Serbia, classified as the Serbian Bunjevac dialect variety of the Danubian branch of the Neo-Shtokavian–Younger Ikavian dialect.

On March 4, 2021, the municipal council in Subotica has voted in favor of amending the city statute, adding Bunjevac dialect to the list of official public administrative languages in the municipality, in addition to Serbian, Hungarian, and Croatian. This has created a special situation that contradicts the official position, of both the Government of Serbia and Matica srpska, that classified Bunjevac speech as a dialect.

Popularly, the Bunjevac dialect is often referred to as "Bunjevac language" or Bunjevac mother tongue. At the political level, depending on goal and content of the political lobby, the general confusion concerning the definition of the terms language, dialect, speech, mother tongue, is cleverly exploited, resulting in an inconsistent use of the terms.

The Institute of Croatian Language and Linguistics launched  a proposal, in March 2021, to the Ministry of Culture of the Republic of Croatia, to add Bunjevac dialect to the List of Protected Intangible Cultural Heritage of the Republic of Croatia and was approved on 8 October 2021.

Organizations
(Zavod za kulturu vojvođanskih Hrvata) Institute for Culture of Croats of Vojvodina
Croatian Community in Belgrade “Tin Ujević”

Notable people 
Josip Jelačić, Ban of Croatia
Ilija Okrugić, poet and playwright
Stjepan Horvat, geodesist and professor
Marijan Beneš, former boxer born in Belgrade to a Croat father and a Serb mother 
Ratko Rudić, water polo coach and a former water polo player
Stjepan Filipović, People's Hero of Yugoslavia
Franjo Mihalić, long-distance runner and Olympic silver medalist
Josip Leko, politician who served as the Speaker of the Croatian Parliament
Jovan Mikić, athlete
Davor Štefanek, wrestler and former world champion [27]
Vanja Udovičić,  politician and former professional water polo, Serb mother and Croat father 
Ivica Vrdoljak, footballer
Ivan Sarić, sportsman
Tomislav Žigmanov, Serbian Croat politician, author, publisher, and academic.
Slavoljub Muslin, notable football player.
Neda Arnerić, Serbian and Yugoslav actress, Serb mother and a Croatian father, she was considered a sex symbol of Yugoslav cinematography.
Aljoša Vučković, Serbian actor.
Tamara Boroš, table tennis player

See also 

 Croat National Council
 Croatia–Serbia relations
 Janjevci
 Operation Storm
 Persecution of Croats in Serbia during the Yugoslav Wars
 Serbs of Croatia

Notes

References

External links
 Bunjevac Croatian Cultural and Educational Society in Serbia, Matija Gubec Tavankut, matijagubec.rs
  Hrvatska riječ weekley
  Zajednica protjeranih Hrvata iz Srijema Bačke i Banata
  Hrvati Vojvodine: Josipoviću i Tadiću, zaštitite nas! Otvoreno pismo. Published 17 Feb 2011 by Večernji list.

Croats of Serbia
Serbia
Ethnic groups in Serbia